Eupauloecus is a genus of spider beetles found in western North America. They consume conifers.

Selected species
Eupauloecus unicolor (Piller & Mitterpacher, 1783)

References

External links

Eupauloecus at Fauna Europaea

Ptinidae
Bostrichiformia genera